Françoise Gauthier (born 1 January 1953) is a Canadian politician.

Born in Laterrière, Quebec, Gauthier was a member of the National Assembly of Quebec for Jonquière from 2001 to 2007.

References

1953 births
Living people
Women government ministers of Canada
Members of the Executive Council of Quebec
Politicians from Saguenay, Quebec
Quebec Liberal Party MNAs
Women MNAs in Quebec
21st-century Canadian politicians
21st-century Canadian women politicians